Trihydridoboron, also known as borane or borine, is an unstable and highly reactive molecule with the chemical formula . The preparation of borane carbonyl, BH3(CO), played an important role in exploring the chemistry of boranes, as it indicated the likely existence of the borane molecule. However, the molecular species BH3 is a very strong Lewis acid. Consequently, it is highly reactive and can only be observed directly as a continuously produced, transitory, product in a flow system or from the reaction of laser ablated atomic boron with hydrogen.

Structure and properties 

BH3 is a trigonal planar molecule with  D3h symmetry. The experimentally determined B–H bond length is 119 pm.

In the absence of other chemical species, it reacts with itself to form diborane. Thus, it is an intermediate in the preparation of diborane according to the reaction: 
BX3 +BH4− → HBX3− + (BH3) (X=F, Cl, Br, I)
2 BH3 → B2H6
The standard enthalpy of dimerization of BH3 is estimated to be  −170 kJ mol−1.
The boron atom in BH3 has 6 valence electrons. Consequently, it is a strong Lewis acid and reacts with any Lewis base ('L' in equation below) to form an adduct:
BH3 + L → L—BH3
in which the base donates its lone pair, forming a dative covalent bond. Such compounds are thermodynamically stable, but may be easily oxidised in air. Solutions containing borane dimethylsulfide and borane–tetrahydrofuran are commercially available; in tetrahydrofuran a stabilising agent is added to prevent the THF from oxidising the borane. A stability sequence for several common adducts of borane, estimated from spectroscopic and thermochemical data, is as follows:
PF3 < CO< Et2O< Me2O< C4H8O < C4H8S < Et2S< Me2S< Py < Me3N< H−

BH3 has some soft acid characteristics as sulfur donors form more stable complexes than do oxygen donors. Aqueous solutions of BH3 are extremely unstable.
 + 3 →  +

Reactions 
Molecular BH3 is believed to be a reaction intermediate in the pyrolysis of diborane to produce higher boranes:
B2H6 ⇌  2BH3
BH3 +B2H6 → B3H7 +H2 (rate determining step)
BH3 + B3H7 ⇌  B4H10
B2H6 + B3H7 → BH3 + B4H10
⇌  B5H11 + H2
Further steps give rise to successively higher boranes, with B10H14 as the most stable end product contaminated with polymeric materials, and a little B20H26.

Borane ammoniate, which is produced by a displacement reaction of other borane adducts, eliminates elemental hydrogen on heating to give borazine (HBNH)3.

Borane adducts are widely used in organic synthesis for hydroboration, where BH3 adds across the C=C bond in alkenes to give trialkylboranes:
(THF)BH3 + 3 CH2=CHR → B(CH2CH2R)3 + THF
This reaction is regioselective, Other borane derivatives can be used to give even higher regioselectivity. The product trialkylboranes can be converted to useful organic derivatives. With bulky alkenes one can prepare species such as [HBR2]2, which are also useful reagents in more specialised applications. Borane dimethylsulfide which is more stable than borane–tetrahydrofuran may also be used.

Hydroboration can be coupled with oxidation to give the hydroboration-oxidation reaction. In this reaction, the boryl group in the generated organoborane is substituted with a hydroxyl group.

As a Lewis acid
Phosphine-boranes, with the formula R3−nHnPBH3, are adducts of organophosphines and borane.

Borane(5) is the dihydrogen complex of borane. Its molecular formula is BH5 or possibly BH3(η2-H2). It is only stable at very low temperatures and its existence is confirmed in very low temperature. Borane(5) and methanium (CH5+) are isoelectronic. Its conjugate base is the borohydride anion.

See also
Butterfly cluster compound

References